Optimality may refer to:

 Mathematical optimization
 Optimality Theory in linguistics
 optimality model, approach in biology

See also

 Optimality theory (disambiguation)
 
 Optimism (disambiguation)
 Optimist (disambiguation)
 Optimistic (disambiguation)
 Optimization (disambiguation)
 Optimum (disambiguation)